Montgomerie Glacier is a narrow tributary glacier,  long, flowing north along the west side of Hampton Ridge in the Queen Alexandra Range of Antarctica to enter Lennox-King Glacier. It was named by the Northern Party of the New Zealand Geological Survey Antarctic Expedition of 1961–62 for John Montgomerie, assistant surveyor of that party.

References

Glaciers of Shackleton Coast